In This House, On This Morning is an album by the jazz trumpeter Wynton Marsalis, released in 1994 by Columbia Records. The album peaked at number seven on Billboard Top Jazz Albums chart.

Critical reception
AllMusic's Scott Yanow wrote "The set does take quite awhile to get going with much of the first two parts consisting of introductions and transitions to themes that never seem to arrive," but that "due to the memorable final section, this lengthy work is one of the high points of [Marsalis's] career thus far."

Personnel
Wess “Warmdaddy” Anderson – alto sax, sopranino sax
Eric Reed – piano
Reginald Veal – bass 
Wycliffe Gordon – trombone 
Todd Williams – tenor sax, soprano sax
Herlin Riley – drums, tambourine
Marion Williams – vocals

Track listing

References

1994 albums
Wynton Marsalis albums
Columbia Records albums